Salarias ramosus, the starry blenny, is a species of combtooth blenny from the Western Central Pacific. It occasionally makes its way into the aquarium trade.  This species can reach a length of  TL.

References

External links
 

ramosus
Taxa named by Hans Bath
Fish described in 1992